The 2nd district of the Iowa Senate, located in Northwestern Iowa, 
is currently composed of Plymouth and Sioux counties. Its current member of the Iowa Senate is Republican Jeff Taylor.

Current elected officials
Jeff Taylor is the senator currently representing the 2nd District.

The area of the 2nd District contains two Iowa House of Representatives districts:
The 3rd District (represented by Dennis Bush)
The 4th District (represented by Skyler Wheeler)

The district is also located in Iowa's 4th congressional district, which is represented by U.S. Representative Randy Feenstra.

List of representatives

Past senators
The district has previously been represented by:

David T. Brigham, 1856–1859
Gideon S. Bailey, 1860–1861
Abner H. McCrary, 1862–1865
Eliab Doud, 1866–1869
Jacob G. Vale, 1870–1873
James B. Pease, 1874–1877
Horatio A. Wonn, 1878–1879
Henry C. Traverse, 1880–1881
Alexander Brown, 1882–1883
John W. Carr, 1884–1887
B.R. Vale, 1888–1895
Thomas Bell, 1896–1899
Henry H. Brighton, 1900–1903
James Elerick, 1904–1908
William S. Allen, 1909–1912
John Taylor, 1913–1916
George Ball, 1917–1920
Charles Fulton, 1921–1928
A.V. Blackford, 1929–1932
John N. Calhoun, 1933–1936
Sanford Zeigler Jr., 1937–1944
Alden Doud Jr., 1945–1952
Charles Nelson, 1953–1956
Norval Evans, 1957–1960
Dewey Phelps, 1961–1964
Max E. Reno, 1965–1968
Charles G. Mogged, 1969–1970
Marvin W. Smith, 1971–1972
Irvin L. Bergman, 1973–1980
Richard Vande Hoef, 1981–1982
Donald V. Doyle, 1983–1992
Bradly Banks, 1993–1996
John Redwine, 1997–2002
Kenneth Veenstra, 2003–2004
Dave Mulder, 2005–2008
Randy Feenstra, 2009–2021
Jeff Taylor, 2021–present

See also
Iowa General Assembly
Iowa Senate

References

02